This is a list of the populations of the sovereign states and dependent territories in the geopolitical region of Oceania. Although it is mostly ocean and spans many continental plates, Oceania is occasionally listed as one of the continents.

This list follows the boundaries of geopolitical Oceania, which includes Australasia, Melanesia, Micronesia and Polynesia. The main continental landmass of Oceania is Australia.

Table

See also
 List of Eurasian countries by population
 List of Oceanian countries by area

References

Demographics of Oceania
Lists of countries by continent
Oceania
Lists of countries in Oceania
Oceania